Daniel Kraus may refer to:

 Daniel Kraus (footballer) (born 1984), German former footballer
 Daniel Kraus (author), American author
 Dan Kraus (1923–2012), American basketball player